Nikolai Leonidovich Rubinshtein (11 (23) December 1897 - 26 January 1963) was a Soviet historian known for his historiographical works and his research into the economic history of Russia and the formation of capitalism in that country.

Early life and education
Rubinshtein was born on 11 (23) December 1897 in Odessa. He received his advanced education at Novorossiia University in Odessa from which he graduated in 1922.

Career
Rubinshtein taught at higher educational institutions in Moscow from 1934 to 1959 and became a professor in 1938. He was appointed deputy scientific director of the State Historical Museum from in 1943 in which position he served until 1949. He joined the Communist Party in 1944.

He is best known for his historiographical works and his research into the economic history of Russia and the formation of capitalism in that country. He also wrote on the history of popular movements in the Ukraine in the 17th century.

A Jew, Rubinshtein was one of the historians that Arkadiĭ Sidorov campaigned against as part of Joseph Stalin's drive against the "rootless cosmopolitans", most of whom were Jewish.

Death
Rubinshtein died in Moscow on 26 January 1963.

Selected publications
 Russkaia istoriografiia. Moscow, 1941.

References

Further reading
 Dmitriev, S. S. “Kistorii sovetskoi istoricheskoi nauki: Istorik N. L. Rubinshtein.” Uch. zap. Gor’kovskogo un-ta: Seriia istorikofilologicheskaia, 1964, fasc. 72, vol. 1.

1897 births
1963 deaths
Economic historians
Soviet historians
Soviet communists
Historiographers
Jewish historians
Russian Jews
Odesa National Economics University alumni